Ségolène, also Sigolène or Sigolina, is a French name, now solely feminine but previously, in the forms Ségolène, Sigolin or Sigolinus, also occasionally masculine. It is derived from a diminutive of Siga, a mediaeval hypocoristic of Germanic names having the first element Sig- (meaning "victory"). The rarer masculine form of the name was derived in the same way from the masculine hypocoristic Sigo. An alternative explanation of the feminine name is that it is the equivalent of the German name Sieglinde. The form of the name was apparently influenced by the similar Gaulish element Sego- ("victory" or "strength").

People

Female
 Saint Segolena of Troclar otherwise Sigolena of Albi (7th century), French abbess and saint
 Ségolène Amiot (born 1986), French politician
 Ségolène Berger (born 1978), French tennis player
 Ségolène Girard (born 1995), Swiss volleyball player
 Ségolène Lefebvre (born 1993), French boxer
 Ségolène Royal (born 1953), French politician, partner of François Hollande
 Sigolène Vinson (born 1974), French writer and journalist, survivor of the Charlie Hebdo killings

Male
 Saint Sigolin of Stavelot (7th century), abbot of Stavelot Abbey

Places
 Sainte-Sigolène, commune in the Haute-Loire department, France

References

Given names
French feminine given names
French masculine given names
Names of Germanic origin